Stalin-Allee is a German short film by director Sven Boeck.

The film focuses on the Karl-Marx-Allee, also still known as Stalin-Allee. The homogeneous architecture of the street is unique in Europe. In 1952, construction work began. Amidst the ruins of Berlin "palaces for the working class" were built, the "first socialist avenue in Germany".

In the first years of the GDR, Stalin Avenue was the showcase meant to demonstrate the power and effectiveness of the socialist system. Beyond the cultural aspects of the street, a film about Stalin Avenue has to include the failings of the socialist experiment as well. Built during the era of Nation Building, this street is connected with historical events like the rebellion on the 17th of June 1953, in which the construction workers played an important role, the sudden disappearance of the Stalin monument, the demonstrations on the 1st of May and the parades during the era of Erich Honecker.

This is a film about the claims of socialism and the wrong ways to realize it. Its subjective description of today's situation combines the views of the inhabitants, the "Trümmerfrauen" ("rubble women" who rebuilt Germany) and the former construction workers.

External links 
 

1991 films
1990s German-language films
German short documentary films
1990s German films